McLarty is a surname of Scottish origin. People with the name include:

 Colin McLarty, American mathematician
 Edward McLarty (1848–1917), Australian politician
 Gary McLarty (1940–2014), American stuntman
 Hector Neil McLarty (1851–1912), Australian policeman and explorer
 Jack McLarty (1919–2011), American painter
 John McLarty (1842–1909), Australian politician
 Mack McLarty (born 1946), American politician
 Nell McLarty (1912–1998), Australian cricketer
 Norman Alexander McLarty (1889–1945), Canadian politician
 Ron McLarty (1947–2020), American actor and novelist
 Ross McLarty (1891–1962), Australian politician

See also
 Lake McLarty, a lake in Western Australia
 McLarty Treasure Museum, a museum in Florida

Scottish surnames